Paravandellia is a genus of pencil catfishes native to South America.

Species
There are currently two recognized species in this genus:
 Paravandellia oxyptera Miranda-Ribeiro, 1912 (Pantanal parasitic catfish)
 Paravandellia phaneronema (Miles, 1943)

Distribution 
P. oxyptera is distributed in the Paraná, Paraguay, and Uruguay River basins in Brazil, Paraguay, and Uruguay. P. phaneronema originates from the Magdalena and Cauca River basins of Colombia.

Description 
Females have been found at  TL in January (during the wet season) with about 150 mature oocytes each, and males may have well-developed testes at  TL.

Habitat & Habits 
P. oxyptera inhabits rivers with sandy to muddy bottom. This species is a parasite. It forages both during the day and at night, seeking the gill chambers of larger fishes, especially catfishes. It enters and leaves the gill chamber during the host's ventilating movements. There, it feeds on blood drawn from the gill filaments and may stay in the gill chamber for 1–3 min. When gorged with blood, the fish moves to the bottom and buries itself in the sand. A single large catfish tethered on the river bank may feed thousand of these parasitic catfish over a period of up to 6 hours. Large numbers of this fish may kill fishes tethered by fishermen.

References

Trichomycteridae
Fish of South America
Fauna of Brazil
Freshwater fish genera
Taxa named by Alípio de Miranda-Ribeiro